The 1997 Kvalserien was the 23rd edition of the Kvalserien. It determined two teams of the participating ones would play in the 1997–98 Elitserien season and which four teams would play in the 1997–98 Swedish Division 1 season.

Tournament

External links
Tournament on hockeyarchives.info

Kvalserien
Kval